The Legalise Cannabis Western Australia Party (LCWA party) is a political party registered in Western Australia. The party advocates for law reform in relation to cannabis.

History 
The LCWA party is the sister party of the LCQ party and affiliate of the HEMP Party and Medical Cannabis Users Association of Australia (MCUA).

Following in the success of its sister party LCQ in the 2020 Queensland state election the Party was registered by the Western Australian Electoral Commission on 29 January 2021 to contest the 2021 Western Australian state election, at which two of its candidates – Brian Walker in East Metropolitan Region and Sophia Moermond in South-West Region – were elected to the Western Australian Legislative Council.

Legalise Cannabis Western Australia MPs vote against vaccine mandates 

In February 2022, MPs from Legalise Cannabis Western Australia were the only elected representatives in the Western Australian Legislative Council to vote against imposing vaccine mandates on MPs. One of the party's MPs, Sophia Moermond, who had described the mandates as "medical apartheid", was subsequently suspended from parliament under the new rules.

Policies 
The Party's policies are around the personal, medical and industrial uses of cannabis.

In particular, the Party believes:

That government should legalise cannabis and introduce enlightened regulations around its supply and consumption
That a hemp and cannabis industry should be developed and encouraged
That indigenous participation in the industry should be encouraged and subsidised
That access to medicinal cannabis should be easier and low cost
That cheap testing of cannabis products by labs and scientists be facilitated
That criminal convictions for possession of cannabis should be expunged

Electoral results 
The party fielded candidates for the first time in the 2021 Western Australian state election and received two seats in the Legislative Council with the fifth largest number of votes (26,818) by party behind the Nationals. The party fielded a limited number of candidates in the Legislative Assembly and received 4,996 votes.

See also 
 Help End Marijuana Prohibition (HEMP) Party
Legalise Cannabis Queensland Party
 Cannabis in Australia 
 Drug policy reform

References

External links
 Official website

 

2020 establishments in Australia
Political parties established in 2020
Cannabis political parties of Australia
Political parties in Western Australia